Alexander O'Hara (born 21 October 1956) is a Scottish former professional football player, who is best known for his time with Partick Thistle and Greenock Morton.

O'Hara began his career with Rangers in 1973. Whilst at Ibrox he made over fifty appearances and was rumoured to be made an offer by Manchester United He signed for Partick Thistle where he made over 200 league appearances as captain, scoring close to fifty goals during his seven-year spell. He then moved on to Greenock Morton, where he spent six years, making over 200 appearances in total. O'Hara then had a brief spell with Hamilton Academical before he moved to the junior leagues with Glenafton Athletic.

External links
 

1956 births
Living people
Rangers F.C. players
Partick Thistle F.C. players
Greenock Morton F.C. players
Hamilton Academical F.C. players
Association football midfielders
Scottish footballers
Footballers from Glasgow
Glenafton Athletic F.C. players
Scottish Football League players